Gregorytown is a hamlet in Delaware County, New York, United States. It is located southeast of Downsville on the shore of the East Branch Delaware River.

References

Geography of Delaware County, New York
Hamlets in Delaware County, New York
Hamlets in New York (state)